Farahabad Mosque is related to the Safavid dynasty and is located in Mazandaran Province, Sari County.This mosque is part of the Farahabad Complex.

Gallery

References

Mosques in Iran
Mosque buildings with domes
National works of Iran